"Heartbroke Every Day" is a song written by Rick Vincent, Bill LaBounty and Cam King. It first appeared on the 1994 self-titled album of the band Pearl River.

It was later recorded by American country music band Lonestar. Lonestar's version was released in December 1996 as the fifth and final single from the debut album Lonestar.  The song reached number 18 on the Billboard Hot Country Singles & Tracks chart. It was also the only single of their career to feature then-member John Rich on lead vocals instead of Richie McDonald. Then, they reprised it again in 2010 with then-lead singer Cody Collins on lead vocals since McDonald left.

Critical reception
A review in Billboard was favorable, praising the song for its "tasty guitar work", "virtually flawless production", and "bluegrass-inflected lead vocal".

Chart performance

References

1996 singles
Lonestar songs
Songs written by Bill LaBounty
Song recordings produced by Don Cook
BNA Records singles
Songs written by Rick Vincent
1994 songs